Alki Beach Park is a  park located in the West Seattle neighborhood of Seattle, Washington that consists of the Elliott Bay beach between Alki Point and Duwamish Head. It is open daily from 4am to 11:30pm.

The beach has a replica of the Statue of Liberty that was installed in 1952. The Alki Point Monument memorializing Seattle's pioneer White settlers is also located in the park. Dogs are allowed in the park, but not on the beach, there is a $500.00 fine for pets on the beach.

On June 27, 1959, reports of an unexploded naval mine caused the beach to be closed while police evacuated 1,000 people. The reported mine was found to be a homemade anchor with long spikes.

References

External links 

Alki Beach Park, Seattle Department of Parks and Recreation.

https://en.wikipedia.org/wiki/Craig_Venter

1907 establishments in Washington (state)
Parks in Seattle
Beaches of Washington (state)
West Seattle, Seattle